Character assassination (CA) is a deliberate and sustained effort to damage the reputation or credibility of an individual. 

The phrase "character assassination" became popular from around 1930. This concept, as a subject of scholarly study, was originally introduced by Davis (1950) in his collection of essays revealing the dangers of political smear campaigns. Six decades later Icks and Shiraev (2014) rejuvenated the term and revived academic interest by addressing and comparing a variety of historical character assassination events.

Studying CA
Icks and Shiraev (2014) address several political science models to explain CA reasons from the attacker's point of view. They believe that the attacker's motivation is often based on the intent to destroy the target psychologically or reduce his/her public support and/or chances to succeed in a political competition. For example, during elections, attacks are often used to sway undecided voters, create uncertainty with tentative voters, or prevent defections of supporters. These attacks therefore become an effective means of manipulating voters toward a desirable action. They also facilitate the repositioning of originally favorable supporters to the ranks of the "undecided" or "uncommitted" voters.

Narcissism 

According to Thomas, character assassination is an intentional attempt, usually by a narcissist or his or her codependents, to influence the portrayal or reputation of someone in such a way as to cause others to develop an extremely negative or unappealing perception of them. It typically involves deliberate exaggeration or manipulation of facts, the spreading of rumours and deliberate misinformation to present an untrue picture of the targeted person, and unwarranted and excessive criticism.

Psychopathy in the workplace 

The authors of the book Snakes in Suits: When Psychopaths Go to Work describe a five phase model of how a typical workplace psychopath climbs to and maintains power. In phase four (confrontation), the psychopath will use techniques of character assassination to maintain their agenda.

In politics

In Australian politics, a Dorothy Dixer is a rehearsed or planted question asked of a government Minister by a backbencher of their own political party during Parliamentary Question Time. While intended to enable a Minister to discuss or address concerns about the subject asked of him, a Dixer will often conclude with "Is the Minister aware of any alternative policies?" This addition allows the Minister to launch into often aggressive attacks on the opposition, which depending on the leeway offered by the Speaker (who is a member of the ruling party and thus will usually side with the Minister), can include not just attacks on Opposition policy, but attempts to character assassinate opposition members directly.

Charging an opponent with character assassination may have political benefits.  In the hearings for Clarence Thomas' nomination to the Supreme Court of the United States, supporters claimed that both Clarence Thomas and Anita Hill were victims of character assassination.

In a totalitarian regime
The effect of a character assassination driven by an individual is not equal to that of a state-driven campaign.
The state-sponsored destruction of reputations, fostered by political propaganda and cultural mechanisms, can have more far-reaching consequences. One of the earliest signs of a society's compliance to loosening the reins on the perpetration of crimes (and even massacres) with total impunity is when a government favors or directly encourages a campaign aimed at destroying the dignity and reputation of its adversaries, and the public accepts its allegations without question. The mobilisation toward ruining the reputation of adversaries is the prelude to the mobilisation of violence in order to annihilate them. Generally, official dehumanisation has preceded the physical assault of the victims.

Specific examples include Zersetzung, by the Stasi secret service agency of East Germany, and kompromat in Russia. It was also prevalent during the Red Scare in the United States, being carried out by both the government and the media.

The International Society for the Study of Character Assassination
The International Society for the Study of Character Assassination (ISSCA) specializes in the academic study and research of how character attacks and assassinations have been executed in both history and during contemporary times. In July 2011, scholars from nine countries gathered at the University of Heidelberg, Germany, to debate "the art of smear and defamation in history and today". They formed a group to study character assassination throughout the ages. The group included historians, political scientists, and political psychologists.

Research Lab for Character Assassination and Reputation Politics
Founded in 2016 in cooperation with the ISSCA, the Research Lab for Character Assassination and Reputation Politics (CARP) includes scholars with disciplinary homes in psychology, history, communication and public relations. With investigators from George Mason University, the University of Baltimore, and the University of Amsterdam, the CARP team focuses efforts along three main dimensions: research on historical and contemporary examples of character assassination; education for academic and public audiences about character assassination causes, impacts and prevention; and risk assessment to determine vulnerabilities and mitigation strategies for public figures concerned about their reputations. The Mason CARP website features materials about the lab and its activities. The CARP Lab additionally publishes a blog and is affiliated with the Global Informality Project, a leading online resource for the world's open secrets, unwritten rules and hidden practices, broadly defined as 'ways of getting things done.' This global and growing collection of invisible, yet powerful informal practices is made possible by the remarkable collaboration of scholars from five continents.

In 2017 and 2019, CARP hosted two international conferences that welcomed numerous U.S. and international researchers and academics studying different aspects of CA. The proceedings and report of the CARP 2017 conference 'Character Assassination in Theory and Practice' can be found on the Mason website.

The CARP 2019 conference 'Character Assassination and Populism: Challenges and Responses' featured critical input from practitioners in crisis management, journalism, and public relations. The event attracted scholars from twenty countries around the world.

In 2019, the CARP Lab published its first handbook titled "Routledge Handbook of Character Assassination and Reputation Management".

See also

References

Aggression
Abuse
Bullying
Narcissism
Political campaign techniques
Political metaphors
Psychological abuse